This is a list of Brazilian diplomats.

 Baron of Rio Branco
 Viscount of Rio Branco
 Joaquim Nabuco
 José Maurício Bustani
 Luiz Martins de Souza Dantas
 Oswaldo Aranha
 Rubens Ricupero
 Rui Barbosa
 Walter Moreira Salles
 Antonio Patriota
 Roberto Azevedo, Director-General of WTO
 Maria Luiza Ribeiro Viotti

Diplomats
Brazilian